Morus rubra, commonly known as the red mulberry, is a species of mulberry native to eastern and central North America. It is found from Ontario, Minnesota, and Vermont south to southern Florida, and west as far as southeastern South Dakota, Nebraska, Kansas, and central Texas. There have been reports of isolated populations (very likely naturalized) in New Mexico, Idaho, and British Columbia.

Common in the United States, it is listed as an endangered species in Canada, and is susceptible to hybridization with the invasive white mulberry (M. alba), introduced from Asia.

Description 
It can live up to 125 years.

Unlike the leaves of white mulberry (M. alba) which have a lustrous upper surface, the red mulberry leaf upper surface is noticeably rough, similar in texture to fine sandpaper, and the underside is densely covered with soft hairs. The leaf petiole exudes milky sap when severed. The leaves turn yellow in autumn.

The flowers are relatively inconspicuous: small, yellowish green or reddish green and opening as leaves emerge.  Male and female flowers are usually on separate trees although they may occur on the same tree.

It is initially pale green, ripening to red or dark purple.

The red mulberry develops an extensive root system, containing lateral, horizontal roots that remain within the upper 24 inches of the soil and smaller, vertical roots that go off the lateral roots. This combination gives stability and allows the tree to uptake the nutrients from the soil surface where nutrients are most abundant..

Red mulberry is hardy to subzero temperatures, relatively hardy to drought, pollution, and poor soil, though the white mulberry is hardier.

The berries are widely sought after by birds in spring and early summer in North America; as many as 31 species of birds have been recorded visiting a fruiting tree in Arkansas. The Red Mulberry is pollinated by the wind.

Uses 
The berries are edible and sweet. The first English colonists to explore eastern Virginia in 1607 mentioned the abundance of both mulberry trees and their fruit, which was eaten (sometimes boiled) by the native Powhatan tribes. Today, mulberries are eaten raw, used in the fillings of pastries, and fermented into wine. They are also used for marmalades, liquors, natural dyes, and cosmetics. The berries are not commercially sold because they have very short “shelf lives” and pack/ship very poorly.
The wood may be dried and used for smoking meats with a flavour that is mild and sweet. It is also used for fenceposts because the heartwood is relatively durable. Other uses of the wood include farm implements, cooperage, furniture, interior finish, and caskets.
Some Native American tribes used an infusion of the bark as a laxative or purgative. Infusions of the root were used to treat weakness and urinary ailments. The sap was applied to the skin to treat ringworm. Choctaw people wove clothing from the inner bark of young M. rubra and similar shoots.

Culture and History 
Documentations of the use of red mulberry go back to 1500 by the De Soto expedition, which recorded the consumption of dried fruits by the indigenous Muskogee peoples. There were diverse uses of mulberry in different indigenous cultures. Among them, the Cherokee mixed cornmeal and sugar to the berries, to make sweet dumplings. Later on, European settlers also used the mulberry fruits to make pies or preserves. 
The trees were also important as a source of livestock feed and wood for furniture or boats.

Distribution 
The Red mulberry plant is native to the United States. M. rubra occurs from the Atlantic coast to the eastern edge of the Great Plains, south to southern Florida and north to southwestern Ontario in Canada. The native Red mulberry can be mostly found in riparian areas, and is considered rare and threatened in many areas including northeastern United States and southeastern Canada. The morphologically similar M. alba is potentially posing a threat to the existence of M. rubra because of the rapid range expansion, aggressive growth patterns, and reproductive advantages over M. rubra. Red mulberry is currently considered endangered in Canada, and in the USA, the states of Connecticut and Massachusetts as well as threatened in Michigan and Vermont

Climatic and Soil Requirements 
Mulberry grows in various climatic conditions and can be found in climates between temperate and tropical. Red mulberry plants require a total annual rainfall of 1’000-2’000 mm and are adapted to altitudes of up to 800 msl. The native environment of red mulberry most often consists of moist forests, thickets on the floodplains, moist hillsides and river valleys. 
It can tolerate short periods of flooding and can tolerate temperatures as low as -36°C. Optimal growing temperatures are between 24 and 28°C. At least 140 frost free days a year are required.
Normally, the tree grows in full sun, but growth is also possible in partial shading. Red mulberry is also drought tolerant.

In its native habitat red mulberry grows in mesic hardwood forests in moist soils, although they can be found in many different moist soils. Such soils include, inceptisols, alfisols, spodosols and ultisols. The plants prefer deep, well drained, soils that reach from loamy to clayey and have a high moisture holding capacity. A soil pH of 5-7 is optimal.

Cultivation 
In an early stage, pruning is necessary to make the red mulberry tree develop a sturdy framework. Afterwards, the pruning requirements of the red mulberry involve mainly removing dead or overcrowded wood. To keep the tree in a tidy form, it is suggested to choose a few main branches and cut the laterals to six leaves in July. This allows the spurs to develop near the main branches. However, the Red Mulberry Tree tends to bleed after pruning, so pruning should be reduced to a minimum and should be conducted when the tree is dormant, as the bleeding is less severe then. Removing branches of more than 2 diameters should be absolutely avoided, anyway.
When tilling the soil, it must be paid attention not to damage the horizontal roots. Cutting them, would impair nutrient uptake.
In the first year of a red mulberry’s lifetime, a sufficient water supply is critical for the development of the root system. Young mulberry trees should be watered thoroughly twice a week if growing on light soils and once a week if growing on clay soils. Later, the red mulberry is drought tolerant, although under water scarcity it may drop its fruits too early which results in berry yield losses. Thus, for berry production, irrigation is recommended under dry conditions.
Mulching helps to retain moisture in the soil and to reduce the competition with grass and weeds. Thus, it is recommended to apply mulch under mulberry trees. The mulch should not touch the stem as this may lead to rotting.
Mulberry trees thrive with little to no fertilizer. Fertilizing more than twice a year should be avoided and fertilizing later than July may lead to freeze damage. An NPK value of 10-10-10 is targeted and depending on the available nutrients in the soil, other nutrients like iron should be added.
Usually, the red mulberry is free from pests and diseases but in some areas the “popcorn disease” may occur. In that case, infected fruits should be collected and burned, to prevent the pathogens population to reproduce and survive for the next season.
If cultivated for fruits, male and female plants must be grown, if a monoecious variety is chosen. However, there are also dioecious varieties. To harvest the fruit, branches are usually shaken and the fruit collected manually.

Yield 
Mulberries yield wood for timber, with an average 10-15 m height and diameter of 50 cm. The timber volume is 0.962 m³ to 1.435 m³.
Mulberry wood has the same quality as oak, which can be sold for 90-150 euro per m3. Nevertheless, to achieve a quantity of 1m3, we should have to take down the whole tree, which can be counterproductive in the case of fruit production.
Nevertheless, the wood from the trimming can still be used as firewood and the biggest parts for furniture or turned objects. An additional yield of 8–12 tons/acre/year (20–30 tons/hectare/year) can be achieved with the littler parts and the leaves which serve as forage.
Only 2 to 3 years after whip cultivar plantation, the tree should already start to fruit. The yields of fruits should reach 3 to 5 kg (per tree per year) on the first years until 300 kg for a mature tree.

Economic aspects 
In 2015, almost 3.4 million pounds of frozen mulberries were imported to the US – a market value of 2.6 million US-Dollars. The demand for the fruit is still rising and the prices are high. This constitutes a great opportunity for mulberry producers.
It takes ten years from the seedling stage, until a mulberry tree bears fruit. Thus, for the decision of building up a mulberry orchard, one needs to estimate not the current demand but the market potential of ten years later. This involves more risk and long-term planning. However, there are grafted varieties that produce fruit earlier and reduce this problem.
In future, the economic viability of mulberry production may increase even more as its drought resistance constitutes an opportunity for agriculture under climate change and as the fruit contains many micronutrients and vitamins, while people pay more and more attention to healthy nutrition.
As mulberry production is not yet mechanized well, a lot of labor is required, especially to harvest the fruit. However, there is potential for mechanizing the shaking of the branches, similar as in tart cherry harvesting. A difficulty in the commercial use of mulberries is the fragility of the berries which constitutes a challenge in storage and transport.
The leading producers of mulberry fruit are Turkey and Iran. They are the main mulberry suppliers to Europe. However, they mainly produce white and black mulberry - thus, the production of Red Mulberry is still less widespread.
Agroforestry constitutes an opportunity to further improve the viability of red mulberry cultivation. Short-duration legume crops as intercrops improve the soil control weeds and create an additional revenue.

Nutritional aspects 
Fresh mulberries are mainly water. Per 100g, they provide 9.8g carbs, 1.7g fiber, 1.4g protein and 0.4g fat. Per cup (140g), they only have 60 calories. 
Dried mulberries, which is the most consumed form, contain 70g carbs, 14g fibers, 12g proteins and 3g fats per 100g. 
A high and diverse amount of vitamins and minerals are contained in the berries. Vitamin C, E and K for example, as well as iron and potassium or other plant compounds like athocyanins, cyanidin, rutin or chlorogenic acid.
All these properties place berries as a way to fight cancer, improve blood sugar levels, and even lower cholesterol levels.

Limitations and drawbacks 
Despite all mentioned opportunities and benefits, there are a few drawbacks and limitations to the cultivation of the red mulberry:
 The red mulberry cannot be used for silk production as the white mulberry. Silkworms reject the leaves of the red mulberry.
 The red mulberry cannot be used as a short-term solution, due to the time until the first fruit bearing. Instead, it requires long-term planning. The highest years are obtained after 30-85 years.
 Despite is drought tolerance, it is not unproblematic to cultivate the red mulberry under drought conditions as fruits fall down too early if the root system lacks water.
 The fruits are delicate which complicates the commercial use.
 Sensitive people may be confronted with dermatitis when touching the leaves, the stem or the unripe fruits of a mulberry tree. The leave sap and unripe fruits can even lead to hallucinations and central nervous system disturbances.
 though quite resistant to many pathogens, there are some diseases that can occur in mulberry
 The fruits are liked by several mammal and bird species which on the one hand is beneficial for biodiversity but on the other hand leads to yield losses or high protection costs, as netting is difficult for such big trees.
 Breeding takes long due to the long generation time.
 Common pests and diseases that affect mulberry plants include mulberry leaf spot, bacterial blight (bacterium – Pseudomonas syringae pv. mori), powdery mildew (fungi – Phyllactinia corylea and Uncinula geniculata) or different root rot diseases.

References

External links 
 Interactive Distribution Map of Morus rubra
 
 

rubra
Plants described in 1753
Taxa named by Carl Linnaeus
Trees of the North-Central United States
Trees of the Northeastern United States
Trees of the South-Central United States
Trees of the Southeastern United States
Trees of Eastern Canada
Fruit trees